Fra Giovanni da Verona (c. 1457, Verona – 1525) was an Italian Olivetan monk, sculptor, architect, miniature painter and woodworker. He was active between the late 15th and early 16th centuries.

He was a pupil of fra Bastian Virgola (also known as Sebastiano Schiavone da Rovigno).

References

Italian Benedictines
Artists from Verona
15th-century Italian architects
16th-century Italian architects
15th-century Italian sculptors
16th-century Italian sculptors
Manuscript illuminators
Italian woodworkers
1450s births
1525 deaths
Olivetan Order
Architects from Verona